Balurghat is a railway station on the Eklakhi–Balurghat branch line and is located in Dakshin Dinajpur district in the Indian state of West Bengal. It serves Balurghat city and the surrounding areas.

Eklakhi–Balurghat line
The extension of the Eklakhi–Balurghat branch line to Hili was announced in the Rail Budget for 2010–11. Initial work for the  Balurghat-Hili railway line has been taken up by Northeast Frontier Railway. In the initial stages major expenditure is anticipated for land acquisition. The estimates are around Rs. 300 crores.  of land is required to be acquired. District Magistrate, Dakshin Dinajpur is also involved in the process.

References

External links
 Trains at Balurghat
 

Railway stations in Dakshin Dinajpur district
Katihar railway division
Balurghat
Railway stations opened in 2004